= Psychotoxicity =

Psychotoxicity is a pharmacology term that refers to the effect when a drug interferes seriously with normal behaviour.
